The men's K-2 1000 metres competition in canoeing at the 2008 Summer Olympics took place at the Shunyi Olympic Rowing-Canoeing Park in Beijing between August 18 and 22.  The K-2 event is raced in two-person kayaks.

Competition consists of three rounds: the heats, the semifinals, and the final. All boats compete in the heats. The top 3 in each of the two heats advances directly to the final, while the next four finishers (places 4 through 7) in each heat move on to the semifinals. The top three finishers in each of the two semifinals join the heats winners in the final.

Schedule
All times are China Standard Time (UTC+8)

Medalists

Results

Heats
Qualification Rules: 1..3->Final, 4..7->Semifinal + 8th best time, Rest Out

Heat 1

Heat 2

Sweden's disqualification as of 2009 was not given.

Semifinal
Qualification Rules: 1..3->Final, Rest Out

Final

Poland finished fourth originally, but was disqualified when Seroczyński tested positive for doping. After a year of deliberation and court cases, it was determined on 11 December 2009 that Poland was disqualified. Additionally, Seroczyński was banned from competition for two years. He is the first canoer to fail a doping test in the Summer Olympics.

References

Men's canoe/kayak flatwater racing: K-2 1000m.
Sports-reference.com 2008 K-2 1000 m results.
Yahoo! August 18, 2008 sprint heats results. – accessed August 19, 2008.
Yahoo! August 20, 2008 sprint semifinal results. – accessed August 20, 2008.
Yahoo! August 22, 2008 sprint final results. – accessed August 22, 2008.

Men's K-2 1000
Men's events at the 2008 Summer Olympics